Ivan Platonovich Grave (Иван Платонович Граве in Russian) ( in Kazan – March 3, 1960 in Moscow) was a Russian and Soviet scientist in the field of artillery, Doctor of Technical Sciences (1939), professor (1927), member of the Academy of Artillery Sciences (1947-1953), Major General of the Engineer Corps (1942).

Ivan Grave graduated from the Mikhailovskoye Artillery School (1895) and Mikhailovskaya Artillery Academy (1900), where he would begin to teach four year later. In 1916, Grave invented a missile powered by smokeless powder and launched from mobile launchers, and first experiments of primitive liquid-fueled rockets, and therefore he is also known as father of Katyusha. On July 14 of that year he files the patent request No. 746 for a rocket burning smokeless gunpowder, that is issued in 1924. In 1918, he participated in creating the RKKA Artillery Academy, where he would work as a head of studies and head of a department until 1943. Ivan Grave was one of the founders of the Soviet school of internal ballistics. Ivan Grave authored two major works called Internal Ballistics (Внутренняя баллистика) (1933-1938) and Ballistics of Semiclosed Space (Баллистика полузамкнутого пространства) (1940).

In 1938 Ivan Grave was arrested under the false accusation of participating in the "Military-Fascist Plot," but was released in February 1939 after denunciation of "Yezhovshchina" (the reign of the then NKVD chief Yezhov) and during campaign against slander by Joseph Stalin's order as a particularly valuable specialist.

Ivan Grave was awarded the Stalin Prize (1942), Order of Lenin, Orders of the Red Banner, Order of the Patriotic War (1st Class), Order of the Red Star, and numerous medals.

The crater Grave on the Moon is named after him.

References 

1874 births
1960 deaths
Inventors from the Russian Empire
Military engineers from the Russian Empire
Soviet military engineers

Academic staff of Military Engineering-Technical University
Stalin Prize winners
Soviet major generals
Recipients of the Order of Lenin
Recipients of the Order of the Red Banner
Military personnel from Kazan